St Finbarr's National Hurling & Football Club or St Finbarr's Hurling and Football Club is a Gaelic Athletic Association club based in the Togher area of Cork city, County Cork, Ireland.

St Finbarr's, who play in royal blue and gold jerseys, are the only club in Ireland to win All-Ireland club championships in both hurling and football. The club has won Cork County Senior Championships in every decade except the first decade of the 21st century. This record was almost upheld in 2009 when the club reached the final in the Cork County Senior Football Championship, only to lose out by a point to Clonakilty.

Between 1980 and 1982, the club won three Cork County Hurling Championships in a row. This feat had not been repeated until Imokilly did so between 2017 and Vincent’s

Hurling

Honours

All-Ireland Senior Club Hurling Championships: 2
 1975, 1978 (Runners-Up 1981)
Munster Senior Club Hurling Championships: 4
 1968, 1974, 1977, 1980
Cork Senior Hurling Championships: 26
 1899, 1904, 1905, 1906, 1919, 1922, 1923, 1926, 1932, 1933, 1942, 1943, 1946, 1947, 1955, 1965, 1968, 1974, 1977, 1980, 1981, 1982, 1984, 1988, 1993, 2022
Cork Minor Hurling Championships: 15
 1909, 1939, 1940, 1941, 1947, 1948, 1975, 1980, 1986, 1990, 1991, 1992, 1993, 1997, 2020
Cork Premier Under-21 A Hurling Championships: 5
 1985, 1990, 1991, 1992, 1994
Cork Intermediate Hurling Championships: 1
 1990
Cork Junior Hurling Championships: 3
 1902, 1903, 1956
Cork City Junior Hurling Championship: 12
 1927, 1940, 1941, 1942, 1955, 1956, 1972, 1981, 1985, 1990, 2004, 2014
 Cork Inter-Divisional Junior B Hurling Championship: 1
 2015

Notable hurlers
This is a list of notable hurlers who have played for 'the Barrs', including players who have had success with the club, or played for the Cork senior hurling team.

Notable Teams

Managers

Football

Honours
All-Ireland Senior Club Football Championships: 3
 1980, 1981, 1987
Munster Senior Club Football Championships: 5
 1979, 1980, 1982, 1986, 2021
Cork Senior Football Championships: 10
 1956, 1957, 1959, 1976, 1979, 1980, 1982, 1985, 2018, 2021
Cork Premier Intermediate Football Championships: 1
 2008
 Cork Under-21 Football Championships: 7
 1973, 1977, 1978, 1985, 1986, 2008, 2016
Cork Minor Football Championships:  25
 1941, 1942, 1944, 1950, 1959, 1961, 1962, 1963, 1968, 1971, 1973, 1975, 1977, 1982, 1983, 1984, 1985, 1996, 1997, 2007, 2009,2010,2015,2021
Cork City Junior Football Championship: 9
 1941, 1947, 1951, 1960, 1961, 1988, 2011, 2013, 2014
 Kelleher Shield (Senior Football League) Winners 1973, 1981, 1983, 1984, 1987, 1989, 1990, 2019

Notable footballers
 Dave Barry
 Mark "Sozzler" Maher
 Paddy Hayes
 Tony Leahy
 Mark Healy
 John Kerins
 Christy Ryan
 Michael Shields
 Ian Maguire
 Mick Slocum
 Jimmy Barry Murphy
 Fionán Murray
 Steven Sherlock
 Sam Ryan

Managers

See also
 Blackrock–St Finbarr's hurling rivalry
 Glen Rovers–St Finbarr's hurling rivalry

References

External links
Cork GAA site
St Finbarr's GAA site

 
1876 establishments in Ireland
Gaelic games clubs in County Cork
Gaelic football clubs in County Cork
Hurling clubs in County Cork